The Monteverdi Safari is a Swiss luxury SUV first presented by Peter Monteverdi in 1976. It entered into production in 1977. Production came to an end in 1982, after production of the International Harvester Scout (upon which the Safari was based, and with which the Safari shared many parts) came to an end. There was also a lower-priced version called the Sahara, which retained the Scout's original bodywork with some modifications.

History
Despite the manufacturer’s tradition as a supercar manufacturer, the 1977 domestic market price of CHF 39,000 was only CHF 5,000 higher than that of the less well-appointed Range Rover. There were relatively few luxury SUVs offered in Europe at this time, and while the Safari’s sales volumes were dwarfed by those of the Range Rover, they were high compared to the company’s other models targeted at the higher end of the Maserati/Ferrari class. The body was built by Fissore, with whom Monteverdi had a long standing relationship.

The driving experience was enhanced by an automatic transmission, switchable all-wheel drive, electric windows and a well chosen selection of instruments behind the steering wheel. Despite the upright look of the body, the angle of the driver seat was relatively sporty, even though the overall height of the vehicle meant that the Safari driver was still well positioned to look down on conventional sedans/saloons.

The torque and added displacement gave it a significant performance advantage over the 3.5 litre-engined Range Rover of the time. A 5.7 litre  International Harvester V8 engine was also offered, and the manufacturers maintained that the drive train components were also engineered to be able to accommodate Chrysler’s 7.2 litre  unit. In its 5.2 litre form, the vehicle achieved a maximum speed of 165.1 km/h (103 mph) and took 13.1 seconds to reach 100 km/h (62 mph) from a standing start. The price of this level of performance in such a heavy vehicle showed up in the overall fuel consumption figure of  achieved during the 1977 road test from which these performance figures are taken.

See also
Range Rover Classic

References

External links 
 Brochure Monteverdi Safari, 1978
 Monteverdi Safari technical data in 1976

Safari
Crossover sport utility vehicles
All-wheel-drive vehicles
1980s cars
Cars introduced in 1976